Salla Koskela  (born 7 May 1992) is a Finnish ski orienteering competitor.

At the 2017 World Ski Orienteering Championships she won a silver medal in women's sprint, as well as in the middle distance.

References

1992 births
Living people
Finnish orienteers
Ski-orienteers